Bob Roth (born October 10, 1950) is an American Transcendental Meditation (TM) teacher and author. He is the CEO of the David Lynch Foundation and a director of the Center for Leadership Performance.

Early life and education 
Bob Roth was born in Washington, D.C., U.S.A. He is the son of Dr. Merall Roth, a radiologist, and Susan Roth, a teacher. He attended Redwood High School in Larkspur, California, and graduated from the University of California at Berkeley.

Career 
Roth is the CEO of the David Lynch Foundation and has taught TM for nearly 50 years. His students include thousands of at-risk students in underserved schools, military veterans, women and children who have experienced domestic violence, and numerous celebrities like Tom Hanks, Oprah Winfrey, Hugh Jackman, Martin Scorsese, Katy Perry, Russell Brand, and others.

Roth learned TM at the Berkeley TM Center in 1969. In 1972, he took a semester off college to travel to Spain and study with Maharishi Mahesh Yogi. After six months of study, Roth became a TM teacher himself.

Roth is the author of Maharishi Mahesh Yogi's Transcendental Meditation and the 2018 New York Times bestseller Strength in Stillness: The Power of Transcendental Meditation. As CEO of the David Lynch Foundation, Roth has helped bring Transcendental Meditation to more than one million students in underserved schools in 35 countries, to military veterans and their families who suffer from post-traumatic stress, and to women and children who are survivors of domestic violence. Roth also directs the Center for Health and Wellness, which is bringing meditation to Fortune 100 companies, government agencies, and nonprofit organizations. Roth is the host of the iHeartRadio podcast “Stay Calm,” and on his Sirius XM radio show, Success without Stress, Roth sits down with prominent meditators to discuss their practices and the influence of Transcendental Meditation on their lives. Roth has spoken about the “science of meditation" to industry leaders at such gatherings as Google Zeitgeist, Aspen Ideas Festival, Aspen Brain Conference, Wisdom 2.0, Summit, Global Wellness Summit, and CURA's Unite To Cure at The Vatican.

Personal life 
Roth resides in New York, N.Y. He has three siblings: his sister, Ellen, and brothers Bill and Tom. Having grown up in the San Francisco Bay Area, Roth is a fan of the San Francisco Giants and Golden State Warriors. He idolized Willie Mays in his youth and is a big fan of Stephen Curry today.

Awards 
In 2015, Roth was the recipient of the Disruptor Award from the Tribeca Disruptive Innovation Awards for David Lynch Foundation's innovative work serving at-risk populations.

Publications and works 
 Maharishi Mahesh Yogi's Transcendental Meditation. Plume, 1988. 978-1556110856
 Strength in Stillness: The Power of Transcendental Meditation. Simon & Schuster, 2018. 978-1501161216

References 

American male writers
American motivational speakers
Living people
1950 births